The 2015 Peach Bowl was a college football bowl game that was played on December 31, 2015, at the Georgia Dome in Atlanta, Georgia. The 48th Peach Bowl was one of the New Year's Eve bowl games. It was one of the 2015–16 bowl games that concluded the 2015 FBS football season.  Sponsored by the Chick-fil-A restaurant franchise, the game is officially known as the Chick-fil-A Peach Bowl. The game started at 12:00 PM Eastern Time.

The game was televised on ESPN and ESPN Deportes, and broadcast on ESPN Radio and XM Satellite Radio.

Background
Houston, in their first year under newly hired Tom Herman, raced off to a 10–0 start and a #13 ranking, but a loss to Connecticut opened up a chance for Navy to swoop in and win the division title. However, the Cougars beat the Midshipmen handily to win the West Division and qualify for the first-ever American Athletic Conference championship game. Their victory over Temple the following week gave Houston their first conference title since 2006. Since the Cougars were the highest ranked "Group of Five" ranked team, they were selected to play in the Peach Bowl. This was their first major bowl appearance since the 1985 Cotton Bowl Classic.

Florida State had started the season 6–0 before a loss to Georgia Tech on the final play of the game dropped them from #9 to #17 ranked. A loss to then #3-ranked Clemson curtailed Atlantic Division title hopes in the Atlantic Coast Conference. This was the Seminoles' first Peach Bowl since 2010.

Game summary

Scoring summary

Source:

Statistics

Game notes
 First loss by Jimbo Fisher to a non "Power 5" team at Florida State.
 Houston is 13–2–2 all time against Florida State

References

2015–16 NCAA football bowl games
2015
2015
2015
2015 in sports in Georgia (U.S. state)
December 2015 sports events in the United States
2015 in Atlanta